In proof theory and constructive mathematics, the principle of independence of premise states that if φ and ∃ x θ are sentences in a formal theory and   is provable, then  is provable. Here x cannot be a free variable of φ.

The principle is valid in classical logic. Its main application is in the study of intuitionistic logic, where the principle is not always valid.

In classical logic 

The principle of independence of premise is valid in classical logic because of the law of the excluded middle. Assume that   is provable. Then, if φ holds, there is an x satisfying φ → θ but if φ does not hold then any x satisfies φ → θ. In either case, there is some x such that φ→θ. Thus  is provable.

In intuitionistic logic 

The principle of independence of premise is not generally valid in intuitionistic logic (Avigad and Feferman 1999). Here the proof itself is an input to the function and may be used to construct x. On the other hand, a proof of  must first demonstrate a particular x, and then provide a function that converts a proof of φ into a proof of θ in which x has that particular value.

As a weak counterexample, suppose θ(x) is some decidable predicate of a natural number such that it is not known whether any x satisfies θ. For example, θ may say that x is a formal proof of some mathematical conjecture whose provability is not known. Let φ be the formula . Then  is trivially provable. However, to prove  , one must demonstrate a particular value of x such that, if any value of x satisfies θ, then the one that was chosen satisfies θ. This cannot be done without already knowing whether  holds, and thus  is not intuitionistically provable in this situation.

References 

 

Predicate logic